First Ball (French: Premier bal) is a 1941 French romantic comedy film directed by Christian-Jaque and starring Marie Déa, Fernand Ledoux and Raymond Rouleau.

The film's sets were designed by the art director René Renoux.

Cast
 Marie Déa as Nicole Noblet
Fernand Ledoux as Michel Noblet 
 Raymond Rouleau as Jean de Lormel
 Gaby Sylvia as Danielle Noblet
 François Périer as Ernest Vilar
 Gabrielle Fontan as Marie
 Jean Brochard as Thomas 
 Bernard Blier as Le maitre d'hôtel
 Charles Granval as De Lormel, père
 Marcel Maupi as Mélik
 Anthony Gildès as 	Le facteur 
 Louis Salou as 	François

References

Bibliography 
 Oscherwitz, Dayna & Higgins, MaryEllen. The A to Z of French Cinema. Scarecrow Press, 2009.

External links 
 

1941 films
French comedy films
1941 comedy films
1940s French-language films
Films directed by Christian-Jaque
French black-and-white films
1940s French films